National Geographic is the official journal of the National Geographic Society.

National Geographic or NatGeo may also refer to:

 National Geographic Society, an American non-profit scientific and educational institution
 National Geographic Partners, a for-profit media and travel company
 National Geographic Global Networks, formerly National Geographic Channels, the cable channel company of National Geographic Partners operating the following channels:
 National Geographic (American TV channel)
 National Geographic (Asian TV channel)
 National Geographic (Australian and New Zealand TV channel)
 National Geographic (British and Irish TV channel)
 National Geographic (Canadian TV channel)
 National Geographic (Dutch TV channel)
 National Geographic (French TV channel)
 National Geographic (German TV channel)
 National Geographic (Greek TV channel)
 National Geographic (Indian TV channel)
 National Geographic (Portuguese TV channel)
 National Geographic (Scandinavian TV channel)
 National Geographic (South Korean TV channel)
 National Geographic Studios, formerly National Geographic Television; see National Geographic Partners

See also
 National Geographic Channel (disambiguation)